The 22nd Directors Guild of America Awards, honoring the outstanding directorial achievements in film and television in 1969, were presented in 1970.

Winners and nominees

Film

Television

D.W. Griffith Award
 Fred Zinnemann

External links
 

Directors Guild of America Awards
1969 film awards
1969 television awards
Direct
Direct
Directors